Kim Yong-kook (also transliterated Kim Yong-guk; born 14 December 1966) is a South Korean fencer. He competed in the individual and team foil events at the 1988 and 1996 Summer Olympics.

References

External links
 

1966 births
Living people
Olympic fencers of South Korea
Fencers at the 1988 Summer Olympics
Fencers at the 1996 Summer Olympics
Asian Games medalists in fencing
Fencers at the 1990 Asian Games
Fencers at the 1994 Asian Games
South Korean male foil fencers
Korea National Sport University alumni
Asian Games gold medalists for South Korea
Asian Games silver medalists for South Korea
Medalists at the 1990 Asian Games
Medalists at the 1994 Asian Games